Women's rights in Afghanistan have oscillated back and forth depending on the time period. After King Amanullah Khan's attempts to modernize the country in the 1920s, women officially gained equality under the 1964 Constitution. However, these rights were taken away in the 1990s through different temporary rulers such as the mujahideen and the Taliban during the Afghan civil war. During the first Taliban regime (1996–2001), women had very little to no freedom, specifically in terms of civil liberties. When the Taliban were removed from power following the 9/11 attacks in the United States, women's rights gradually improved under the presidential Islamic Republic of Afghanistan. Women were de jure equal to men under the 2004 Constitution.

After the Taliban return to government in August 2021, the Taliban at first segregated university classrooms by gender, permitting women and girls to remain in education as long as they “followed Islamic standards”. However, the following month, most teenage girls were again prevented from returning to secondary school education, and women were blocked from working in most sectors outside of health and education. Women were ordered to wear face coverings in public, and barred from traveling more than  without a close male relative. In December 2022, the Taliban government also prohibited university education and primary education for females in Afghanistan, sparking protests and international condemnation.

In July 2022, Hibatullah Akhundzada, the Taliban's reclusive leader, lashed out at the criticism and demands of the international community on the Taliban's human rights restrictions, rejecting any negotiations or compromise on his "Islamic system" of governance.

Overview

Afghanistan is on the crossroads of South Asia and Central Asia and has a population of roughly 34 million. Of these, 15 million are male and 14.2 million are female. About 22% of the Afghan people are urbanite and the remaining 78% live in rural areas. As part of local tradition, most women are married soon after completing high school. Many live as housewives for the remainder of their lives.

History

Before Amanullah Khan

During the Durrani Empire (1747-1823) and the early Barakzai dynasty Afghan women customarily lived subjected in a state of purdah and gender segregation imposed by patriarchal customs.  While this was the case in all Afghanistan, the customs differed somewhat between regions and ethnic groups. Nomadic women, for example, did not have to hide their faces and even showed some of their hair.

Women did not play any public role in society, however there were some women, such as Nazo Tokhi and Ayesha Durrani, who became noted as poets and writers, which was an art form possible for a woman to perform while living in the seclusion of the harem.

The rulers of Afghanistan customarily had a harem of four official wives as well as a large number of unofficial wives for the sake of tribal marriage diplomacy, in addition to enslaved harem women known as kaniz (“slave girl”) and surati or surriyat ("mistress"), guarded by the ghulam bacha (eunuchs).  Some women had influence over the affairs of state from inside the royal harem, notably Zarghona Anaa, Mirmon Ayesha and Babo Jan.

Some Afghan rulers have attempted to increase women's freedom. For the most part, these attempts were unsuccessful. However, there were a few leaders who were able to make some significant, if temporary, changes. Some limited reforms were made by Abdur Rahman Khan, who banned some forms of oppression originating from tribal customs rather than Islam, among them the custom of forcing widows to marry their brother-in-laws, and enforced some rights which Islam did approve of but local tribal customs did not, such as the right of widows to inherit.

Amanullah Khan

The first reformer to have made significant reform was King Amanullah, who ruled from 1919 to 1929 and made some of the more noteworthy changes in an attempt to unify as well as modernize the country. He promoted freedom for women in the public sphere in order to lessen the control that patriarchal families exerted over women. King Amanullah stressed the importance of female education. Along with encouraging families to send their daughters to school, he promoted the unveiling of women and persuaded them to adopt a more western style of dress. In 1921, he created a law that abolished forced marriage, child marriage, and bride price, and put restrictions on polygamy, a common practice among households in the Afghanistan region.

Modern social reform for Afghan women began when Queen Soraya, wife of King Amanullah, made rapid reforms to improve women's lives and their position in the family, marriage, education and professional life.  She founded the first women's magazine (Irshad-e Naswan, 1922), the first women's organization (Anjuman-i Himayat-i-Niswan), the first school for girls (Masturat School in 1920), the first theatre for women in Paghman and the first hospital for women (the Masturat Hospital in 1924).  Queen Soraya set an example for the abolition of gender segregation by appearing with her husband, famously removing her veil in public, and her example was followed by others.  The king declared that the veil was optional, permitted Western clothes in Kabul and reserved certain streets for men and women wearing modern clothes.  In 1928, Amanullah sent fifteen female graduates of the Masturat middle school, daughters of the royal family and government officials, to study in Turkey.  Soraya Tarzi was the only woman to appear on the list of rulers in Afghanistan, and was credited with having been one of the first and most powerful Afghan and Muslim female activists.

However, Queen Soraya, along with her husband's, advocacy of social reforms for women led to a protest and contributed to the ultimate demise of her and her husband's reign in 1929.  King Amanullah Khan's deposition caused a severe backlash, and his successor reinstated the veil and repelled the reforms in women's rights, reinforcing purdah.  The Women's Association as well as the women's magazine was banned, the girls 'schools were closed, the female students who had been allowed to study in Turkey was recalled to Afghanistan and forced to put on the veil and enter purdah again, and polygamy for men was reintroduced.

Mohammed Zahir Shah

Successors Mohammed Nadir Shah and Mohammed Zahir Shah acted more cautiously, but nevertheless worked for the moderate and steady improvement of women's rights  Women were allowed to take classes at the Masturat Women's Hospital in Kabul in 1931, and some girls' schools were reopened; the first High School for girls was officially called a 'Nursing School' to prevent any opposition to it.  While women were again forced to be veiled in public, unveiling had become accepted in private among the Afghan upper class, and it was noted that upper-class women were met at the Kabul International Airport by servants running up to the stairs of the airplane to deliver a chadar (veil) upon their arrival to Kabul from abroad, since they had not used it during their stay abroad.

After the Second World War modernization reforms were seen as necessary by the government, which resulted in the resurrection of a state women's movement.  In 1946 the government-supported Women's Welfare Association (WWA) was founded with Queen Humaira Begum as patron, giving school classes for girls and vocational classes to women, and from 1950-51 women students were accepted at the Kabul University.

Following the election of Mohammed Daoud Khan as Prime Minister in 1953, social reforms giving women a more public presence were encouraged. One of his aims was to break free from the ultra-conservative, Islamist tradition of treating women as second-class citizens.  During his time, he made significant advances towards modernization.

The Prime Minister prepared women's emancipation carefully and gradually. He began in 1957 by introducing women workers at the Radio Kabul; by appointing women delegates to the Asian Women's Conference in Ceylon; by employing forty girls to the government pottery factory, women as receptionists and telephone operators in the state Tele-Communications agency, and air hostesses at the Aryana Airlines in 1958.

When this was met with no riots, the government decided it was time for the very controversial step of unveiling. In 1959, women employed by the state, such as radio announcers, were asked to come to their work places without the veil, instead wearing a loose coat, scarf and cloves; after that, the foreign wives, and daughters of foreign born wives, were asked to venture out on the streats in the same way, and in this way, women without the veil were started to be seen in the streets of Kabul. In August 1959, on the second day of the festival of Jeshyn, Queen Humaira Begum and Princess Bilqis appeared in the royal box at the military parade unveiled, alongside the Prime Minister's wife, Zamina Begum. A group of Islamic clerics sent a letter of protest to the Prime minister to protest and demand that the words of sharia be respected. The Prime minister answered by inviting them to the capital and present proof to him that the holy scripture indeed demanded the chadri. When the clerics could not find such a passage, the Prime Minister declared that the female members of the Royal Family would no longer wear veils because the Islamic law did not demand it.  While the chadri was never banned, the example of the Queen and the Prime Minister's wife was followed by the wives and daughters of government officials as well as by other urban women of the upper class and middle class, with Kubra Noorzai and Masuma Esmati-Wardak known as the first commoner pioneers.
 
The 1964 Constitution of Afghanistan granted women equal rights including universal suffrage and the right to run for office. In the cities, women were able to appear unveiled, serve in public office and hold jobs as scientists, teachers, doctors, and civil servants, and they had a considerable amount of freedom with significant educational opportunities. Afghanistan had its first female cabinet ministers in the 1960s and Jameela Farooq Rooshna became the first female judge in Afghanistan (1969). Women also started appearing in media and entertainment. Rukhshana is popularly known as one of the first female Afghan pop singers, becoming well known in the 1960s, and Safia Tarzi as the first Afghan fashion designer.

However, despite the effort of the Women's Welfare Association (WWA), the majority of women continued to be excluded from these opportunities, as these reforms had little effect outside of the cities and mainly concerned urban elite women.  The countryside was a deeply patriarchal, tribal society, and the lives of rural women were not affected by the change taking place in the cities.

Republic of Mohammad Daoud Khan
Under the republic of Mohammad Daoud Khan, women's rights and equality were upheld, as Article 27 of the 1976 Constitution of the Republican State of Afghanistan stated:

In 1977, the Revolutionary Association of the Women of Afghanistan (RAWA) was founded by Meena Keshwar Kamal. RAWA still operates in the Afghanistan-Pakistan region.

Communist era

The Democratic Republic of Afghanistan (1978–1987) and the Republic of Afghanistan (1987-1992), which followed the Saur revolution that toppled the government of Mohammed Daoud Khan, was a period of unprecedented equality for women in Afghanistan. The Communist ideology officially advocated gender equality and women's rights, and the communist government sought to implement it - though without success - on all classes throughout both urban and rural Afghanistan.

In 1978, the government, led by Nur Muhammad Taraki, gave equal rights to women. This gave them the theoretical ability to choose their husbands and careers.  The women's emancipation policy of the government were supported by the Democratic Women's Organisation of Afghanistan (DOAW) and later by the Afghan Women's Council (AWC), who sought to implement it. Until 1989, the AWC was led by Masuma Esmati-Wardak and run by a staff of eight women.  The AWC had around 150,000 members and offices in nearly all the provinces.  The AWC provided social services to women in Afghanistan, in the fight against illiteracy and provided vocational training in the secretarial, hairdressing and manufacturing fields.

During the Communist era, women's rights were supported by both the Afghan government as well as by the Soviets who supported them. In contrast to what had been the case during the monarchy, when women's rights had been restricted to urban elite women, the Communists attempted to extend women's rights to all classes of society, also to rural women and girls.
 
The communist government's ideological enforcement of female emancipation in the rural areas took the form of enforced literacy campaigns for women and compulsory schooling for girls, which was heavily resisted in particularly the Pashtun tribal areas. The Communists abolished patriarchal customs still prevalent in rural areas, such as the bride price, and raised the age of consent to marriage for girls to sixteen.  In rural Afghanistan, gender seclusion was a strong part of local culture.  To attend school girls would have to leave home, and school was therefore seen as a deeply dishonorable thing.  The policy of compulsory schooling for girls as well as boys was met with a strong backlash from the conservative rural population, and contributed to the resistance against the Soviets and the Communist regime by the Mujahideen, the Islamic guerillas.

The conservative rural population came to regard the urban population as degenerate partially because of the female emancipation, in which urban women mixed with men and participated in public life unveiled, and education for women, and by extension women's rights in general, came to be associated with Communism and atheism.

While female emancipation was a part of the regime's policy, this policy was introduced mainly to benefit the party rather for any humanist principle.  With a few exceptions, such as Anahita Ratebzad, Masuma Esmati-Wardak and Salcha Faruq Etemadi, most women were active at the low and the middle level of party hierarchy rather than the top.  During the Communist regime, thousands of urban women were recruited to the cadres and militias of the PDPA party and the Democratic Women's Organisation of Afghanistan, and trained in military combat against the Mujahideen, the Islamic guerillas, and there was a concern among urban women that the reactionary fundamentalists would topple the Communist regime and the women's rights it protected.

The AWC came to symbolize women's rights in the eyes of many, who feared the sacrificing of the AWC in the national reconciliation talks which started in 1987.  It is claimed that in 1991 around seven thousand women were in the institution of higher education and around 230,000 girls studying in schools around Afghanistan. There were around 190 female professors and 22,000 female teachers.

Mujahideen era

In 1992, the government under Mohammad Najibullah transitioned to the Islamic State of Afghanistan.  War in Afghanistan continued into a new phase when Gulbuddin Hekmatyar started a bombardment campaign against the Islamic State in Kabul. During the violent four-year civil war, a number of women were kidnapped, and some of them were raped.

The Mujahideen had viewed the Communist regime as godless and anti Islamic partially because of the women's emancipation supported by the Communist policy, and when in power, their goal was to abolish the freedom women had enjoyed during the Communist regime in order to Islamicize society.  The restrictions imposed when the Islamic State was established were "the ban of alcohol and the enforcement of a sometimes-purely-symbolic veil for women". 
On 27 August 1993, the Government Office of Research and Decrees of the Supreme Court issued an order to government agencies and state functionaries to dismiss all women in their employ, and further decreed: 
"Women need not leave their homes at all, unless absolutely necessary, in which case, they are to cover themselves completely; are not to wear attractive clothing and decorative accessories; do not wear perfume; their jewelry must not make any noise; they are not to walk gracefully or with pride and in the middle of the sidewalk; are not to talk to strangers; are not to speak loudly or laugh in public; and they must always ask their husbands’ permission to leave home."
In reality however this decree remained on paper only, since the government did not have enough control of the country to implement their desired policy. Women, thus, remained in the workplace despite the decree and the liberal provisions of the 1964 constitution were largely upheld. 
During the instable political situation in which different Islamic parties fought one another for domination, women in Kabul were abducted from their homes, jobs and offices and subjected to various forms of abuse by rivaling Mujahidin groups.  Many educated women and professional women were abducted and killed because the Mujahidin considered their minds to have been poisoned.

Women began to be more restricted after Hekmatyar was integrated into the Islamic State as Afghan Prime Minister in 1996.  He demanded for women who appeared on TV to be fired.

First Islamic Emirate of Afghanistan

Like their leader Mullah Omar, most Taliban soldiers were poor villagers educated in Wahhabi schools in neighboring Pakistan. Pakistani Pashtuns also joined the group. The Taliban declared that women were forbidden to go to work and that they were not to leave their homes unless accompanied by a male family member. When they did go out, they were required to wear an all-covering burqa. Women were denied formal education and were usually forced to stay at home.

During the Taliban's five-year rule, women in Afghanistan were essentially put under house arrest, and often forced to paint their windows over so that no one could see in or out. Some women who once held respectable positions were forced to wander the streets in their burqas, selling everything they owned or begging in order to survive. The United Nations refused to recognize the Taliban government, with the United States imposing heavy sanctions, leading to extreme economic hardship.

Because most teachers had been women before the Taliban regime, the new restrictions on women's employment created a huge lack of teachers, which put an immense strain on the education of both boys and girls. Although women were banned from most jobs, including teaching, some women in the medical field were allowed to continue working. This is because the Taliban required that women could be treated only by female physicians.

Several Taliban and Al-Qaeda commanders engaged in human trafficking, abducting women and selling them into forced prostitution and slavery in Pakistan. Time Magazine writes: "The Taliban often argued that the brutal restrictions they placed on women were actually a way of revering and protecting the opposite sex. The behavior of the Taliban during the six years they expanded their rule in Afghanistan made a mockery of that claim."

Islamic Republic of Afghanistan

In late 2001, the United States invaded Afghanistan, and a new government under Hamid Karzai was formed, which included women like in pre-1990s Afghanistan. Under the new constitution of 2004, 27 percent of the 250 seats in the House of the People are reserved for women.

In March 2012, President Karzai endorsed a "code of conduct" which was issued by the Ulema Council. Some of the rules state that "women should not travel without a male guardian and should not mingle with strange men in places such as schools, markets and offices." Karzai said that the rules were in line with Islamic law and that the code of conduct was written in consultation with Afghan women's group." Rights organizations and women activists said that by endorsing this code of conduct, Karzai was endangering "hard-won progress in women's right since the Taliban fell from power in 2001".

The overall situation for Afghan women improved during the 2000s, particularly in major urban areas, but those living in rural parts of the country still faced many problems. In 2013, a female Indian author Sushmita Banerjee was killed in Paktika province by militants for allegedly defying Taliban diktats. She was married to an Afghan businessman and had recently relocated to Afghanistan. Earlier she had escaped two instances of execution by the Taliban in 1995 and later fled to India. Her account of the escape became a Bollywood film, Escape from Taliban.

A 2011 government report found that 25 percent of the women and girls diagnosed with obstetric fistula, a preventable childbirth injury in which prolonged labor creates a hole in the birth canal, were younger than 16 when they married. In 2013, the United Nations published statistics showing a 20% increase in violence against women, often due to domestic violence being justified by conservative religion and culture. In February 2014, Afghanistan passed a law that includes a provision that limits the ability of government to compel some family members to be witnesses to domestic violence. Human Rights Watch described the implementation of the 2009 Law on the Elimination of Violence Against Women as "poor," noting that some cases were ignored.

Under Afghan law, females across the country are permitted to drive vehicles. They are also permitted to participate in certain international events such as Olympic Games and robot competitions. Human rights organizations, including Human Rights Watch and the United States Commission on International Religious Freedom have expressed concern at women's rights in the country. Georgetown Institute for Women, Peace and Security ranks Afghanistan as one of the worst countries for women.

According to the new law signed by Ashraf Ghani president of Afghanistan, Afghan women were allowed to include their names on their children's birth certificates and identification cards. This law served as a major victory for Afghan women's rights activists, including Laleh Osmany, who campaigned under the social media hashtag #WhereIsMyName, for several years for both the parents' names to be included.

Second Islamic Emirate of Afghanistan 

In August 2021, Afghan president Ashraf Ghani and the United States left the country, and the Taliban took control and established a new all-male government. The interim government has not been recognized internationally, since the international community linked recognition to respect for women's and minority rights.
Despite repeated assurances by the Taliban that women's rights would be respected, severe restrictions have been placed on their access to education and work. In some areas, the Taliban forced women to stop working altogether. Education in lower grades resumed only in classes segregated by gender. In higher grades (7 through 12) and at the university level, classes for girls and women have been suspended. On 27 September, the new chancellor of Kabul University, Mohammad Ashraf Ghairat, announced that women were not allowed to return to university to either study or work. The Taliban cited security concerns as the reason for these measures, however, did not specify under which conditions girls would be allowed to return to school.

The new Taliban interim cabinet does not include any women as either ministers or deputy ministers. The Ministry of Women's Affairs has been abolished. The protests by women that followed these announcements, especially in Kabul, have been met with violence by the Taliban security forces.

In May 2022, the Ministry for the Propagation of Virtue and the Prevention of Vice published a decree requiring all women in Afghanistan to wear full-body coverings when in public (either a burqa or an abaya paired with a niqāb, which leaves only the eyes uncovered). The decree said enforcement action including fines, prison time, or termination from government employment would be taken against male "guardians" who fail to ensure their female relatives abide by the law. Rights groups, including the United Nations Mission in Afghanistan, sharply criticized the decision. The decision is expected to adversely affect the Islamic Emirate's chances of international recognition.

Violence against Afghan women 

Many women in Afghanistan experience at least one form of abuse. In 2015, the World Health Organization reported that 90% of women in Afghanistan had experienced at least one form of domestic violence. Violence against women is widely tolerated by the community, and it is widely practiced in Afghanistan. Violence against women in Afghanistan ranges from verbal abuse and psychological abuse to physical abuse and unlawful killing.

From infancy, girls and women are under the authority of their fathers or husbands. Their freedom of movement is restricted since they are children and their choice of husbands is also restricted. Women and girls are deprived of education and denied economic liberty. In their pre-marriage and post-marriage relationships, their ability to assert their economic and social independence is limited by their families. Most married Afghan females are faced with the stark reality that they are forced to endure abuse. If they try to extricate themselves from the situation of abuse, they invariably face social stigma, social isolation, persecution for leaving their homes by the authorities and honor killings by their relatives.

Customs and traditions which are influenced by centuries-old patriarchal rules prevail, the issue of violence against women becomes pronounced. The high illiteracy rate among the population further perpetuates the problem. A number of women across Afghanistan believe that it is acceptable for their husbands to abuse them. Reversing this general acceptance of abuse was one of the main reasons behind the creation of the EVAW.

In 2009, the Elimination of Violence Against Women (EVAW) was signed into law. The EVAW was created by multiple organizations which were assisted by prominent women's rights activists in Kabul (namely UNIFEM, Rights & Democracy, Afghan Women's Network, the Women's Commission in the Parliament and the Afghan Ministry of Women's Affairs.

In March 2015, Farkhunda Malikzada, a 27-year-old Afghan woman was publicly beaten and slain by an angry mob of radical Muslims in Kabul on a false accusation of Quran desecration. A number of prominent public officials turned to Facebook immediately after the death to endorse the lynching. It was later revealed that she did not burn the Quran.

In 2018, Amnesty International reported that violence against women was perpetrated by both state and non-state actors.

In April 2020, HRW reported that in Afghanistan, women with disabilities face all forms of discrimination and sexual harassment while they are accessing government assistance, health care and schools. The report also detailed everyday barriers which women and girls face in one of the world's poorest countries.

On 14 August 2020, Fawzia Koofi, a member of Afghanistan's peace negotiating team, was wounded in an assassination attempt near the capital, Kabul, while she was returning from a visit to the northern province of Parwan. Fawzia Koofi is a part of a 21-member team which is charged with representing the Afghan government in upcoming peace talks with the Taliban.

A 33-year-old Afghan woman was attacked by three people while she was on her way from work to her home. She was shot and stabbed in her eyes with a knife. The woman survived the attack, but she lost her eyesight. Taliban denied allegations and said that the attack was carried out on her father's order, as he vehemently opposed her working outside of home.

United Nations Human Rights Council have reported that one or two women in Afghanistan are committing suicide every day. UN human rights chief Michelle Bachelet condemned the massive unemployment of women, the restrictions placed on the way they dress, and their access on basic services.

On 12 August 2022, the UN human rights experts urged international community to take stringent actions to protect Afghans from human rights violations including arbitrary detention, summary executions, internal displacement, and unlawful restrictions on their human rights, in particular those most likely to be affected such as women and girls and vulnerable citizens. Since the takeover of Afghanistan by the Taliban in August 2021, the UN has reported a plethora of human rights violations committed by the Taliban, with their virtual erasure and systematic oppression of women and girls from society being particularly egregious.

Honor killings 

In 2012, Afghanistan recorded 240 cases in which women were the victims of honor killings. Of the reported honor killings, 21% of them were committed by the victims' husbands, 7% of them were committed by their brothers, 4% of them were committed by their fathers, and the rest of them were committed by other relatives of the victims.

In May 2017, the United Nations Assistance Mission in Afghanistan concluded that the vast majority of the perpetrators of honor killings were not punished.

On 12 July 2021, a woman in Faryab Province was beaten to death by Taliban militants and her house was set alight.

In Balkh Province in August 2021, Taliban militants killed an Afghan woman because she was wearing tight clothing and because she was not being accompanied by a male relative.

Politics and workforce

A large number of Afghan women served as members of parliament until the Fall of Kabul in early 2021. Some of these included Shukria Barakzai, Fauzia Gailani, Nilofar Ibrahimi, Fauzia Koofi, and Malalai Joya. Several women also took positions as ministers, including Suhaila Seddiqi, Sima Samar, Husn Banu Ghazanfar, and Suraya Dalil. Habiba Sarabi became the first female governor in Afghanistan. She also served as Minister of Women's Affairs. Azra Jafari became the first female mayor of Nili, the capital of Daykundi Province. As of December 2018, Roya Rahmani is the first-ever female Afghan ambassador to the United States. In September 2020, Afghanistan has secured a seat on the U.N. Commission on the Status of Women for the first time, an achievement that is seen as a “sign of progress for a country once notorious for the oppression of women”.

The Afghan National Security Forces (ANSF), which includes the Afghan National Police, have a growing number of female officers. One of the Afghan National Army Brigadier generals is Khatol Mohammadzai. In 2012, Niloofar Rahmani became the first female pilot in the Afghan Air Force pilot training program to fly solo in a fixed-wing aircraft, following the footsteps of Colonel Latifa Nabizada, the first Afghan female pilot ever to fly a military helicopter. Other notable Afghan women include Naghma, Aryana Sayeed, Seeta Qasemi, Yalda Hakim, Roya Mahboob, Aziza Siddiqui, Mary Akrami, Suraya Pakzad, Wazhma Frogh, Shukria Asil, Shafiqa Quraishi, Maria Bashir, Maryam Durani, Malalai Bahaduri, and Nasrin Oryakhil.

The most popular traditional work for women in Afghanistan is tailoring, and a large percentage of the population are professional tailors working from home. Since the fall of the Taliban, women have returned to work in Afghanistan. Some became entrepreneurs by starting businesses. For example, Meena Rahmani became the first woman in Afghanistan to open a bowling center in Kabul. Many others are employed by companies and small businesses. Some engaged in singing, acting, and news broadcasting. In 2015, 17-year-old Negin Khpolwak became Afghanistan's first female music conductor.

In 2014, women made up 16.1% of the labor force in Afghanistan. Because the nation has a struggling economy overwhelmed with massive unemployment, women often cannot find work where they receive sufficient pay. One area of the economy where women do play a significant role is in agriculture. Of the number of Afghans employed in the agriculture field or similar occupations, about 30 percent of them are women. In some areas in Afghanistan, women may spend as much time working on the land as men do, but still often earn three times less than men in wages.

In terms of percentage, women rank high in the fields of medicine and media, and are slowly working their way into the field of justice. Because women are still highly encouraged to consult a female physician when they go to the hospital, nearly fifty percent of all Afghans in the medical profession are women. The number of women having professions in the media is also rising. It was reported in 2008 that nearly a dozen of television stations had all-female anchors as well as female producers. As women are given more opportunities in education and the workforce, more of them are turning towards careers in medicine, media, and justice.

However, even the women that are given the opportunity to have careers have to struggle to balance their home life with their work life, as household tasks are seen as primarily female duties. Since the Afghan economy is weak, very few women can afford to hire domestic helpers, so they are forced to take care of all the household work primarily on their own. Those who choose to work must labour twice as hard because they are essentially holding two jobs.

Airlines have welcomed Afghan women in various roles. The national airline, Ariana Afghan Airlines, said that 30 percent of its workforce were women as of 2020. Private airline Kam Air also had over a hundred women in employment. In February 2021, Kam Air operated the first flight with an all-female crew, including an Afghan pilot, in a domestic flight from Kabul to Herat.

On 24 December 2022, the Taliban announced that they will ban Afghan women from working in national and international aid groups. This move was noted by several international organizations. NGOs ceased their activities. The UN humanitarian chief Martin Griffiths, said that he was waiting for a list of guidelines from the Taliban officials that would allow Afghan women to work in the humanitarian sector.

Education

Education in Afghanistan has gradually improved in the last decade but much more has to be done to bring it to the international standard. The literacy rate for females is merely 24.2%. There are around 9 million students in the country. Of this, about 60% are males and 40% females. Over 174,000 students are enrolled in different universities around the country. About 21% of these are females.

In the early twentieth century, education for women was extremely rare due to the lack of schools for girls. Occasionally girls were able to receive an education on the primary level but they never moved past the secondary level. During Zahir Shah's reign (1933–1973) education for women became a priority and young girls began being sent to schools. At these schools, girls were taught discipline, new technologies, ideas, and socialization in society.

Kabul University was opened to girls in 1947 and by 1973 there were an estimated 150,000 girls in schools across Afghanistan. Unfortunately, marriage at a young age added to the high drop out rate but more and more girls were entering professions that were once viewed as only being for men. Women were being given new opportunities to earn better lives for both themselves and their families. However, after the civil war and the takeover by the Taliban, women were stripped of these opportunities and sent back to lives where they were to stay at home and be controlled by their husbands and fathers.

During the Taliban regime, many women who had previously been teachers began secretly giving an education to young girls (as well as some boys) in their neighborhoods, teaching from ten to sixty children at a time. The homes of these women became community homes for students, and were entirely financed and managed by women. News about these secret schools spread through word of mouth from woman to woman.

Each day young girls would hide all their school supplies, such as books, notebooks and pencils, underneath their burqas to go to school. At these schools, young females were taught basic literary skills, numeracy skills, and various other subjects such as biology, chemistry, English, Quranic Studies, cooking, sewing, and knitting. Many women involved in teaching were caught by the Taliban and persecuted, jailed, and tortured.

The Taliban are still opposed to education for Afghan boys and girls. They are burning down schools, killing students and teachers by all kinds of means, including chemical warfare. For example, in June 2012, fifteen suspects were detained by Afghanistan's National Directorate of Security (NDS) "in connection with the serial anti-school attacks in northern Afghanistan." The NDS believes that Pakistan's Inter-Services Intelligence was behind the idea. During the same period, Pakistan has been refusing to deliver Afghan bound school text books.

In 2015, the Kabul University began the first master's degree course in gender and women's studies in Afghanistan.

Afghan women obtain education in Kazakhstan within the Kazakh-Afghan state educational programme sponsored by the Republic of Kazakhstan. Kazakhstan attaches great importance to empowering women and strengthening stability in Afghanistan. In September 2018, Kazakhstan reached an agreement with the European Union that the EU would contribute two million euros to train and educate Afghan women in Kazakhstan.

In October 2019, Kazakhstan, the EU and the UNDP launched an education programme to train and educate several dozen Afghan women in Kazakh universities over the next five years. As of 2019, almost 900 graduates of Kazakhstan's programme serve in top positions in the Afghan president's office, government ministries, the border guards and police, while others work as respected doctors, engineers and journalists.

Sports

In the last decade, Afghan women have participated in futsal, football, basketball, skiing and various other sports. In 2015, Afghanistan held its first marathon; among those who ran the entire marathon was one woman, Zainab, age 25, who thus became the first Afghan woman to run in a marathon within her own country. In 2004, three years after the fall of the Taliban regime, Afghanistan sent women athletes to the Olympics for the first time. Since then, only four women have competed in the Olympics under the Afghan flag.

Marriage and parenting

Marriages in Afghanistan are usually in accordance with Islam and the culture of Afghanistan. The legal age for marriage in Afghanistan is 16. Afghans marry each other based on religious sect, ethnicity, and tribal association. It is rare to see a marriage between a Sunni Pashtun and a Shia Hazara. The nation is a patriarchal society where it is commonly believed that elder men are entitled to make decisions for their families. A man can divorce his wife without the need for her agreement, whereas the opposite is not the case.

The country has a high total fertility rate, at 5.33 children born/woman as of 2015. Contraception use is low: 21.2% of women, as of 2010/11.

Arranged marriages and forced marriages are reported in Afghanistan. After a marriage is arranged, the two families sign a contract which both parties are socially and culturally obligated to honor. Among low-income families, it is common for the groom to pay a bride price to the bride's family. The price is negotiated only among the parents. The bride price is viewed as compensation for the money that the bride's family has had to spend on her care and upbringing. In almost 50% of cases, the bride is younger than 18 and in 15% of marriages, the bride is younger than 15. Sometimes women resort to suicide to escape these marriages.

In certain areas, females are sometimes bartered in a method of dispute resolution which is called a baad. Proponents of baad claim that it helps prevent enmity and violence between families, although the females themselves are sometimes subjected to a considerable amount of violence both before and after their marriages into families through baad. The practice of baad is technically illegal in Afghanistan.

Under the Afghan law, "if a woman seeks a divorce then she has to have the approval of her husband and needs witnesses who can testify in court that the divorce is justified." The first occurrence in which a woman divorced a man in Afghanistan was the divorce which was initiated by Rora Asim Khan, who divorced her husband in 1927. This event was considered unique at the time when it occurred, but it was an exception, because Rora Asim Khan was a foreign citizen, who obtained her divorce with the assistance of the German embassy.

While it is legal for male citizens to marry foreign non-Muslims, it is illegal for female citizens to do so, and Afghan law considers all Afghan citizens Muslims.

Up until 17 September 2020, Afghan law dictated that only the father's name should be recorded on identification cards. President Ashraf Ghani signed into law an amendment which was long sought by women's rights campaigners since a campaign which garnered high-profile support from celebrities and members of parliament was launched three years ago under the hashtag #WhereIsMyName.

Gallery

See also

Gender roles in Afghanistan
Access for Afghan Women Act
Prostitution in Afghanistan
Women in agriculture in Afghanistan 
Women in the Parliament of Afghanistan 
Humira Saqib

Organisations:
Women for Afghan Women
Revolutionary Association of the Women of Afghanistan
Afghan Women's Network
Afghan Women's Council
Afghan Women's Business Federation
Afghanistan women's national football team
Afghanistan national women's cricket team
Rukhshana Media

General:
Human rights in Afghanistan
Human rights in Muslim-majority countries
Human rights in the Quran
Women in Islam
Women in Asia

References

External links

 U.S. Congressional Research Service, "Afghan Women and Girls: Status and Congressional Action: September 11, 2020 – August 12, 2021"
 , 10 April 2019, TOLOnews.
 , 14 March 2019, France 24 English.
 , 25 February 2019, BBC News.
 , 8 February 2019, France 24 English.
 , 12 December 2017, Zee News.
A Place At The Table: Safeguarding Women's Rights in Afghanistan
Women, Afghan Law, and Sharia
Afghan Khaal or Facial tattoo for women in afghanistan (Khaal)
Women in Afghanistan worry peace accord with Taliban extremists could cost them hard-won rights
Afghanistan's First Female Mayor 'Terrified' of What's to Come With the Taliban

 
 
Afghanistan
Society of Afghanistan
Foreign aid to Afghanistan